Word boundary may refer to:

 Word boundary (linguistics)
 Word boundary (computing)

See also
 Word alignment (disambiguation)